Celestina Casapietra (born 23 August 1938) is an Italian operatic soprano who was a member of the Berlin State Opera for decades. She made an international career, and recorded several operas and concerts.

Life and career 
Born in Genoa, Casapietra made her debut at the Teatro Nuovo in Milan in 1963.

Casapietra was discovered by Otmar Suitner who won her for the Berlin State Opera from 1965. She married the conductor Herbert Kegel; they had a son,  who was born in Genoa and has an Italian passport. Casapietra and Kegel were a glamour couple of the GDR in the 1960s.

In Berlin, she performed roles such as Donna Anna in Mozart's Don Giovanni, Agathe in Weber's Der Freischütz, Elsa in Wagner's Lohengrin, Tatiana in Tchaikovsky's Eugene Onegin, and Maddalena in Giordano's André Chenier. Her contract was cancelled in 1993, leading to a long legal case which she won.

She appeared as a guest at La Fenice in Venice, the Vienna State Opera, the Bavarian State Opera in Munich, the Hamburg State Opera and the Bolshoi Theatre in Moscow. At the Salzburg Festival, she appeared in Cavalieri's Rappresentatione di Anima, et di Corpo from 1969 to 1971.

She also appeared in concerts, recording Bach's Mass in B minor conducted by her husband in 1975, with the Leipzig radio choir and orchestra, Renate Frank-Reinecke, Věra Soukupová, Eberhard Büchner and Siegfried Vogel.

Recordings 
Casapietra recorded the role of Fiordiligi in the German version of Così fan tutte in 1971, with Suitner conducting the Staatskapelle Berlin, alongside Annelies Burmeister as Dorabella, Sylvia Geszty as Despina, Peter Schreier as Ferrando, Günther Leib as Guglielmo and Theo Adam as Don Alfonso.   
Recordings with Casapietra are held by the German National Library:
 Giordano: Andrea Chénier (1973) with Franco Corelli and Piero Cappuccilli, Hardy Classic (DVD)
 Gounod: Margarethe. Excerpts in German. Berlin Classics 1999
 Mahler: Symphony No. 4. Berlin Classics 1996
 Mendelssohn: Symphonies Nos. 1–5, solo in Lobgesang. Eurodisc 1990
 Mozart: Missae / Requiem. Philips 1991
 Mozart: Così fan tutte. Fiordiligi, in a complete recording in Italian. (ETERNA 1969)
 Orff: Carmina Burana. Philips 1992
 Orff: Trionfi. Berlin Classics 1992
 Concerto Lirico. Monopol 1996 (album)
 Wagner: Tannhäuser. Gala 2005

She also took part in the DEFA opera film Gala unter den Linden (GDR, 1977) and played the role of the singing teacher in Arnaud des Pallières' film  (1997).

References

External links 
 
 
 
 Celestina Casapietra (Soprano) Bach Cantatas Website
 Recordings on Archiv Music
 Boris Gruhl: Callas, Crespin, Casapietra, Cervena (in German) musik-in-dresden.de, 4 March 2013
 Recordings on musicMe

1938 births
Living people
Musicians from Genoa
Italian operatic sopranos
20th-century Italian women opera singers